The 1994 Karnataka Legislative Assembly election took place in two phases on 26 November and 1 December 1994 in all the 224 legislative assembly constituencies in the Indian State of Karnataka. The Janata Dal emerged victorious winning 115 seats.

Results

Results by district

List of Winning candidates

References

External links
Highlights of 1994 Karnataka Assembly elections

Karnataka
State Assembly elections in Karnataka
1990s in Karnataka